North Chennai is a geographic term used to refer to the northern part of Chennai city. Though its definition has varied with time and context, it is generally accepted among historians that North Chennai is used for the part of Chennai city situated north of the Coovum River. Encompassing the Fort St George and Georgetown areas from which the city originated, North Chennai is generally considered an area of stagnant growth, but now it is developing that has already reached saturation as a real estate choice. The area is generally notorious for its thick population, narrow roads, poor infrastructure, and high incidence of crime. This characterization is, however, limited to older neighbourhoods close to the sea coast as new areas to the west, like Kilpauk, Anna Nagar, Avadi and Ambattur have good standards of living and acquired desirability as residential areas.

Northwards of Georgetown, extends the Anglo-Indian settlement of Royapuram and the historical town of Thiruvottiyur beyond which North Madras gives way to a series of fishing hamlets or kuppams. The puzhal Lake located Red Hills and famous central prison is developing highly. The port of Ennore located 16 kilometres supplements Chennai Port as a major entrepot for trading vessels. Northwards lie Minjur, Ennore and Thiruvottiyur. Westwards lie the industrial suburbs of Padi, Ambattur Avadi and Thiruninravur. The head office will be at Tondiarpet, was comprise Tiruvottiyur, Tondiarpet, Madhavaram, Perambur and Purasawalkam taluks.

History 

North Chennai originated with the founding of an East India Company factory in the village of Madrasapatnam. The grant was confirmed on 22 August 1639 which is generally considered the date of the city's founding and celebrated as Madras Day and the signatories were Francis Day for the East India Company and Damera Venkata Nayaka a Padmanyaka Velama ruler for the Vijayanagar Empire. The construction of a small fort was started in 1640 and completed by 1652. This would, by the end of the 18th century, with significant alterations and expansions, become the Fort St George that we know today. Prior to the city's founding, fishing hamlets existed in the area.
 
Georgetown remained a fashionable residential area till the early 1900s when congestion and lack of cleanliness compelled people to look for areas further south. It was also Chennai's Central business district till the 1950s when it was supplanted by T. Nagar.

Notes 

Geography of Chennai